Kushk-e Bagh (also Romanized as Kūshk-e Bāgh) is a village in Mehr Rural District, Bashtin District, Davarzan County, Razavi Khorasan Province, Iran. At the 2006 census, its population was 249, in 81 families.

References 

Populated places in Davarzan County